Thorbjørn Frydenlund (15 November 1892 – 13 February 1989) was a Norwegian wrestler.

He competed in Greco-Roman lightweight at the 1912 Summer Olympics. He was a brother of Richard Frydenlund, and both represented the club IF Ørnulf.

References

External links
 

1892 births
1989 deaths
Olympic wrestlers of Norway
Wrestlers at the 1912 Summer Olympics
Norwegian male sport wrestlers
Sportspeople from Oslo